MPF may refer to:

Law enforcement
 Malta Police Force, the national police force of Malta
 Mauritius Police Force, the national police force of the Republic of Mauritius
 Myanmar Police Force, the national police force of Myanmar (Burma)
 Ministerio Publico Federal, a branch of the Public Procecutor's Office in Brazil

U.S. military
 Maritime Prepositioning Force, U.S. military supply ships
 Mobile Protected Firepower, a light tank acquisition program

Other uses
 Mandatory Provident Fund, a pension scheme of Hong Kong
 Mam language (ISO-639: mpf)
 Manchester Punk Festival, a music festival in the United Kingdom, held in Manchester, England
 Massachusetts Promise Fellowship, a non-profit organization
 Maturation-promoting factor, or mitosis-promoting factor, in cell biology
 Metallic path facilities, in telecommunications
 Methodist Peace Fellowship, a pacifist organization
  (Movement for France), a French political party
 Multi-Purpose Food, a nutritional product developed with support from Clifford Clinton